Maria Horn (born ) is an American attorney and politician. A Democrat, she currently represents Connecticut's 64th assembly district in the Connecticut House of Representatives. The district consists of the entire towns of Canaan, Cornwall, Kent, Norfolk, North Canaan, Sharon, and Salisbury, the southern part of Goshen, and much of the city of Torrington.

Early life and career before politics
Horn was born in Ohio and was raised Republican. She became a Democrat as an adult. She earned a Bachelor of Arts from Princeton University in 1986 and a JD from the University of Chicago Law School in 1993. Prior to serving in the Connecticut Congress, Horn was a federal prosecutor for the Southern District of New York and worked in nonprofits. She also served as board president of Indian Mountain School.

Politics

Horn ran against incumbent Brian Ohler in 2018. She won the election after a recount, winning by 57 votes. Horn was reelected in 2020, when she again narrowly defeated Ohler in the general election.

Personal life
She lives in Salisbury, Connecticut.

References

People from Salisbury, Connecticut
Connecticut lawyers
Women state legislators in Connecticut
Democratic Party members of the Connecticut House of Representatives
Year of birth missing (living people)
Living people
21st-century American politicians
21st-century American women politicians